Artjoms Osipovs (born 8 January 1989) is a Russian-Latvian professional footballer, currently playing for Super Nova in the Latvian First League.

Previously he played for FK Ventspils, FK Blāzma Rēzekne, FC Tiraspol, FC Neman Grodno, JFK Olimps/RFS, FC Jūrmala and Skonto Riga.

Club career

FK Jelgava
Osipovs returned to FK Jelgava for the second time on 1 February 2019.

Personal life
He was a non-citizen of Latvia, but at the end of 2014 he gained citizenship of Russia.

References

External links
 
 alyga.lt Artjoms Osipovs 
 lietuvosfutbolas.lt Artjoms Osipovs

1989 births
Living people
Latvian footballers
Latvian expatriate footballers
Expatriate footballers in Belarus
Latvian expatriate sportspeople in Belarus
Expatriate footballers in Moldova
Latvian expatriate sportspeople in Moldova
Expatriate footballers in Lithuania
Latvian expatriate sportspeople in Lithuania
FK Ventspils players
SK Blāzma players
FC Neman Grodno players
FC Tiraspol players
JFK Olimps players
FC Jūrmala players
Skonto FC players
FS METTA/Latvijas Universitāte players
FK Jelgava players
FK Liepāja players
FK Jonava players
Association football defenders